Golam Sarwar (1 April 1943 – 13 August 2018) was a Bangladeshi journalist and writer. He served as the founding editor of Samakal and  Jugantor. He was awarded Ekushey Padak by the Government of Bangladesh in 2014.

Early life and education
Sarwar obtained his bachelor's and master's in Bengali Literature from the University of Dhaka.

Career
In his student life in 1962, Sarwar started his career as a university correspondent at The Azadi. He also joined The Sangbad as a sub-editor. After the Independence of Bangladesh in 1971, he served as the headmaster of Banaripara Union Institution. Later in 1972, he joined The Daily Ittefaq as a senior sub-editor and worked at the newspaper until 1999.

In 1999, Sarwar became the editor of Jugantor and in 2005, he joined Samakal as the founding editor and served as the editor at the newspaper until his death.

Sarwar had served as the chairman of the board of directors of Press Institute of Bangladesh (PIB) since August 2015 and a member of board of directors of Bangladesh Sangbad Sangstha (BSS). He was a member of the Bangladesh Film Censor Board's Appellate Division and had worked as a senior vice-president of the National Press Club several times.

Published books
 Rongin Balloon
 Sompadoker Jobanbondi
 Omiyo Gorol
 Amar Joto Kotha
 Swapna Benche Thak

Awards 
 Ekushey Padak, 2014
 Cultural Journalist forum of Bangladesh (CJFB) lifetime achievement award, 2016
 Ataus Samad Memorial Trust lifetime award, 2017

Personal life
Sarwar was married to Saleha Sarwar. Together they had two sons and a daughter.

Death 
Sarwar died on 13 August 2018 while being treated at a hospital in Singapore. He was suffering from pneumonia and lung complications.

References

1943 births
2018 deaths
People from Barisal District
University of Dhaka alumni
Bangladeshi journalists
Bangladeshi newspaper editors
Bangladeshi male writers
Recipients of the Ekushey Padak